Gaspard Goyrand (3 February 1803 – 23 June 1866) was a French general practitioner, surgeon and politician from Aix-en-Provence. He helped treat cholera from 1835 to 1854, while serving as Deputy Mayor of Aix from 1838 to 1848.

Early life
Jean-Gaspard Goyrand was born in 1803. He was the son of Gabriel-Antoine Goyrand (1754-1826), a religious painter, and Marie Eulalie Ravanas (1762-1825). His father was in exile in Italy during the French Revolution of 1789, and later returned to Aix. His great-uncle, Jean-Louis Goyrand (1718-1790), was a Professor of Medicine at the University of Aix-en-Provence.

He received his doctorate degree in Paris in 1828, where he was taught by Guillaume Dupuytren. He later disagreed with his former professor.

Career
He practised as a physician and surgeon in Aix-en-Provence. From 1835 to 1854, he treated patients with cholera. In the 1850s, he moved to Lourmarin during a third epidemic of cholera. He also served as supervisor of the hot spring in Aix. People believed hot springs were a cure for certain diseases, at the time.

From 1838 to 1848, he served as the Deputy-Mayor of Aix-en-Provence.

He is remembered for a type of wrist-spraining which was named after him.

Death
He died in 1866.

Legacy
The Rue Goyrand, in the Quartier Mazarin of Aix-en-Provence, is named in his honour. It runs from the Rue Laroque to the Rue Frédéric Mistral.

References

1803 births
1866 deaths
People from Aix-en-Provence
French anatomists
Cholera